English tea may refer to:

 English breakfast tea, a strong blend of tea, typical of the English breakfast
 English Tea House and Restaurant, a tea house in Malaysia
 English Tea Time, a meal in the late afternoon typical of Britain
 Tea in the United Kingdom, the general cuisine and culture of tea in Britain